Perrinia concinna is a species of sea snail, a marine gastropod mollusk in the family Chilodontidae.

Description
The height of the shell attains 12 mm. The small, solid, imperforate, whitish shell has an ovate-conic shape. The whorls are a little convex, subimbricating, and separated by profoundly canaliculate sutures;. They are finely crenulated below the sutures. They are covered with encircling lirae with the interstices elegantly clathrate. The base of the shell is convex. The oblique aperture is semicircular. The tortuous columella terminates in a tooth. The outer lip subthickened and obsoletely sulcate inside.

Distribution
This marine species occurs the Philippines and in the Indian Ocean off Réunion.

References

External links
 To Encyclopedia of Life
 To World Register of Marine Species
 

concinna
Gastropods described in 1864